Tiến Thắng may refer to several rural communes in Vietnam, including:

Tiến Thắng, Hanoi, a commune of Mê Linh District
Tiến Thắng, Hà Nam, a commune of Lý Nhân District
Tiến Thắng, Bắc Giang, a commune of Yên Thế District

See also
Tiên Thắng, a commune of Tiên Lãng District in Haiphong